The following is a list of links golf courses; also included are many "links-style" courses and courses that share many of the features of links courses. The list includes links courses which have recently closed in modern times.

Europe

United Kingdom

Scotland

Dumfries & Galloway
Brighouse Bay Golf Club, Kirkcudbright, Dumfriesshire
Portpatrick Dunskey Golf Club – Dunskey Course, Portpatrick, Wigtownshire
Portpatrick Dunskey Golf Club – Dinvin Course (9), Portpatrick, Wigtownshire
Powfoot Golf Club, Annan, Dumfriesshire
St. Medan Golf Club (9), Monreith, Wigtownshire
Southerness Golf Club, Southerness, Dumfriesshire
Wigtownshire County Golf Club, Glenluce, Wigtownshire

Strathclyde
Dundonald Links Golf Club, Irvine, Ayrshire 
Gailes Hotel Golf Club (9), Irvine, Ayrshire
Gailes Links Golf Club, Irvine, Ayrshire 
Girvan Golf Club, Girvan, Ayrshire
Irvine Golf Club, Irvine, Ayrshire
Kilmarnock (Barassie) Golf Club – Barassie Links, Barassie, Ayrshire
Kilmarnock (Barassie) Golf Club – Hillhouse Course (9), Barassie, Ayrshire
Prestwick Golf Club, Prestwick, Ayrshire
Prestwick St Nicholas Golf Club, Prestwick, Ayrshire
Royal Troon Golf Club – Old Course, Troon, Ayrshire
Royal Troon Golf Club – Portland Course, Troon, Ayrshire
Troon Darley Golf Club, Troon, Ayrshire
Troon Fullarton Golf Club, Troon, Ayrshire
Troon Lochgreen Golf Club, Troon, Ayrshire
Turnberry – Ailsa Course, Turnberry, Ayrshire
Turnberry – King Robert the Bruce Course, Turnberry, Ayrshire
Turnberry – Arran Course (9), Turnberry, Ayrshire
West Kilbride Golf Club, West Kilbride, Ayrshire
Western Gailes Golf Club, Irvine, Ayrshire

Argyll & Isles
Bute Golf Club (9), Isle of Bute
Craignure Golf Club (9), Isle of Mull
Colonsay Golf Club (9), Isle of Colonsay
Dunaverty Golf Club, Southend, Kintyre
Iona Golf Club, Isle of Iona
Machrie Golf Club, Isle of Islay
Machrie Bay Golf Club (9), Isle of Arran
Machrihanish Golf Club – Championship Course, Campbelltown, Kintyre
Machrihanish Golf Club – Pans Course (9), Campbelltown, Kintyre
Macrihanish Dunes Golf Club, Campbelltown, Kintyre
Shiskine Golf Club (12), Blackwaterfoot, Isle of Arran
Vaul Golf Club (9), Isle of Tiree

Lothian
Archerfield Links – Fidra Course, Dirleton, East Lothian
Archerfield Links – Dirleton Course, Dirleton, East Lothian
Craigielaw Golf Club, Aberlady, East Lothian
Dunbar Golf Club, Dunbar, East Lothian
Eyemouth Golf Club, Gunsgreen Hill, Berwickshire
Glen Golf Club – East Links, North Berwick, East Lothian
Gullane Golf Club – No.1 Course, Gullane, East Lothian
Gullane Golf Club – No.2 Course, Gullane, East Lothian
Gullane Golf Club – No.3 Course, Gullane, East Lothian
Muirfield – Gullane, East Lothian
Kilspindie Golf Club, Aberlady, East Lothian
Longniddry Golf Club, Longniddry, East Lothian
Luffness New Golf Club, Aberlady, East Lothian
Musselburgh Links, The Old Golf Course (9), Musselburgh, East Lothian
North Berwick Golf Club – North Berwick, East Lothian
The Renaissance Club, Dirleton, North Berwick
Winterfield Golf Club, Dunbar, East Lothian

Fife
Anstruther Golf Club (9), Anstruther, Fife
Crail Golfing Society – Balcomie Links, Crail, Fife
Crail Golfing Society – Craighead Links, Crail, Fife
Dumbarnie Links, Drumeldrie, Fife (opened May 2020)
Elie Golf House Club, Elie & Earlsferry, Fife
Elie Sports Club – Baird Course (9), Elie & Earlsferry, Fife
Fairmont St Andrews – Torrance Course, St Andrews, Fife
Fairmont St Andrews – Kittocks Course, St Andrews, Fife
Kinghorn Golf Club, Kinghorn, Fife
Kingsbarns Golf Links, St Andrews, Fife
Leven Links Golf Course, Leven, Fife
Lundin Golf Club, Lundin Links, Fife
St Andrews Links – Old Course, St Andrews, Fife
St Andrews Links – New Course, St Andrews, Fife
St Andrews Links – Castle Course, St Andrews, Fife
St Andrews Links – Jubilee Course, St Andrews, Fife
St Andrews Links – Eden Course, St Andrews, Fife
St Andrews Links – Strathtyrum Course, St Andrews, Fife
St Andrews Links – Balgove Course (9), St Andrews, Fife
Scotscraig Golf Club, Tayport, Fife

Angus
Arbroath Golf Links, Arbroath, Angus
Carnoustie Golf Links – Championship Course, Carnoustie, Angus
Carnoustie Golf Links – Burnside Course, Carnoustie, Angus
Carnoustie Golf Links – Buddon Course, Carnoustie, Angus
Monifieth Golf Links – Medal Course, Monifieth, Angus
Monifieth Golf Links – Ashludie Course, Monifieth, Angus
Panmure Golf Club, Barry, Angus
Montrose Golf Links – Medal Course, Montrose, Angus
Montrose Golf Links – Broomfield Course, Montrose, Angus

North East
Balnagask Golf Course, Aberdeen
Cruden Bay Golf Club – Championship Course, Cruden Bay, Aberdeenshire
Cruden Bay Golf Club – St Olaf Course (9), Cruden Bay, Aberdeenshire
Fraserburgh Golf Club – Corbiehill Links, Fraserburgh, Aberdeenshire
Fraserburgh Golf Club – Rosehill Links (9), Fraserburgh, Aberdeenshire
Inverallochy Golf Club, Inverallochy, Aberdeenshire
Kings Links Golf Course, Aberdeen
Menie Golf Links, Balmedie, Aberdeenshire
Murcar Links Golf Club – Murcar Course, Aberdeen
Murcar Links Golf Club – Strabathie Course (9), Aberdeen
Newburgh On Ythan Golf Club, Ellon, Aberdeenshire
Peterhead Golf Club – Old Course, Peterhead, Aberdeenshire
Peterhead Golf Club – New Course (9), Peterhead, Aberdeenshire
Rosehearty Golf Club, Rosehearty (9), Aberdeenshire
Royal Aberdeen Golf Club – Balgownie Links, Aberdeen
Royal Aberdeen Golf Club – Silverburn Links, Aberdeen
Royal Tarlair Golf Club, Macduff, Aberdeenshire
Stonehaven Golf Club, Stonehaven, Aberdeenshire

Moray Coast
Buckpool Golf Club, Buckie, Banffshire
Covesea Links Golf Club (9), Duffus, Moray
Cullen Links Golf Club, The Royal Burgh of Cullen, Moray
Garmouth and Kingston Golf Club, Garmouth, Moray
Hopeman Golf Club, Hopeman, Moray
Moray Golf Club – Old Course, Lossiemouth, Moray
Moray Golf Club – New Course, Lossiemouth, Moray
Nairn Golf Club – Championship Course, Nairn
Nairn Golf Club – Cameron Course (9), Nairn
Nairn Dunbar Golf Club, Nairn
Spey Bay Golf Club, Moray, Aberdeenshire
Strathlene Golf Club, Buckie, Banffshire

Highlands & Islands
Askernish Golf Club, South Uist, Outer Hebrides
Barra Golf Club (9), Castlebay, Isle of Barra, Outer Hebrides
Benbecula Golf Club (9), Isle of Benbecula, Outer Hebrides
Brora Golf Club, Brora, Sutherland
Castle Stuart Golf Club, Inverness, Invernessshire
Durness Golf Club (9), Durness, Sutherland
Fortrose & Rosemarkie Golf Club, Fortrose, Ross-shire
Gairloch Golf Club (9), Gairloch, Ross-shire
Golspie Golf Club, Golspie, Sutherland
Harris Golf Club (9), Isle of Harris, Outer Hebrides
Iona Golf Club, Iona
Isle of Skye Golf Club (9), Sconser, Isle of Skye
Reay Golf Club, Reay, Caithness
Royal Dornoch Golf Club – Championship Course, Dornoch, Sutherland
Royal Dornoch Golf Club – Struie Course, Dornoch, Sutherland
Sanday Golf Club (9), Sanday, Orkney Islands
Skibo Castle – Carnegie Club, Dornoch, Sutherland
Stromness Golf Club, Stromness, Orkney Islands
Tain Golf Club, Tain, Ross-shire
Tarbat Golf Club (9), Portmahomack, Ross-shire
Traigh Golf Club (9), Arisaig, Invernessshire
Uig Lodge Golf Course (9), Isle of Lewis, Outer Hebrides
Westray Golf Club (9), Westray, Orkney Islands
Whalsay Golf Club, Whalsay, Shetland Islands
Wick Golf Club, Wick, Caithness

England

South West
Bude & North Cornwall Golf Club, Bude, Cornwall
Burnham & Berrow Golf Club – Championship Course, Burnham-on-Sea, Somerset
Burnham & Berrow Golf Club – Channel Course (9), Burnham-on-Sea, Somerset
Isles of Scilly Golf Club, Hugh Town, Isles of Scilly
Minehead & West Somerset Golf Club, Minehead, Somerset
Mullion Golf Club, Helston, Cornwall
Newquay Golf Club, Newquay, Cornwall
Perranporth Golf Club, Perranporth, Cornwall
Royal North Devon Golf Club, Westward Ho!, Devon
St. Enodoc Golf Club – Church Course, Rock, Cornwall
Saunton Golf Club – East Course, Braunton, Devon
Saunton Golf Club – West Course, Braunton, Devon
Thurlestone Golf Club, Kingsbridge, Devon
Trevose Golf & Country Club – Championship Course, Trevose, Cornwall
Warren Golf Club, Dawlish, South Devon
West Cornwall Golf Club, Lelant, Cornwall
Weston-super-Mare Golf Club, Weston-super-Mare, Somerset

South East
Freshwater Bay Golf Club, Freshwater Bay, Isle of Wight
Gosport & Stokes Bay Golf Club (9), Gosport, Hampshire
Hayling Golf Club, Hayling Island, Hampshire
Littlehampton Golf Club, Littlehampton, West Sussex
Littlestone Golf Club – Championship Course, Littlestone, Kent
Littlestone Golf Club – Warren Course (9), Littlestone, Kent
Prince's Golf Club, Sandwich, Kent
Royal Cinque Ports Golf Club, Sandwich, Kent
Royal St George's Golf Club, Sandwich, Kent
Rye Golf Club (UK) – Old Course, Rye, East Sussex
Rye Golf Club (UK) – Jubilee Course (12), Rye, East Sussex

East Anglia
Clacton-on-Sea Golf Club, Clacton-on-Sea, Essex
Felixstowe Ferry Golf Club – Martello Course, Felixstowe, Suffolk
Felixstowe Ferry Golf Club – Kingsfleet Course (9), Felixstowe, Suffolk
Frinton Golf Club – Havers Course, Frinton, Essex
Frinton Golf Club – Kirby Course (9), Frinton, Essex
Gorleston Golf Club, Gorleston-on-Sea, Norfolk
Great Yarmouth & Caister Golf Club, Caister-on-Sea, Norfolk
Hunstanton Golf Club, Hunstanton, Norfolk
Royal Cromer Golf Club, Cromer, Norfolk
Royal West Norfolk Golf Club, Brancaster, Norfolk
Sheringham Golf Club, Sheringham, Norfolk

Midlands
North Shore Golf Club, Skegness, Lincolnshire
Sandilands Golf Club, Sutton on Sea, Lincolnshire (closed 2018)
Seacroft Golf Club, Skegness, Lincolnshire

North West
Blackpool North Shore Golf Club, Blackpool, Lancashire
Caldy Golf Club, Caldy, Merseyside
Castletown Golf Links, Castletown, Isle of Man
Dunnerholme Golf Club (9), Askam-in-Furness, Cumbria
Fairhaven Golf Club, Lytham St Annes, Lancashire
Fleetwood Golf Club, Fleetwood, Lancashire
Formby Golf Club, Formby, Merseyside
Formby Ladies Golf Club, Formby, Merseyside
Furness Golf Club, Barrow-in-Furness, Cumbria
Hesketh Golf Club, Southport, Merseyside
Hillside Golf Club, Southport, Merseyside
Leasowe Golf Club, Moreton, Wirral
Maryport Golf Club, Maryport, Cumbria
Royal Birkdale Golf Club, Southport, Merseyside
Royal Liverpool Golf Club, Hoylake, Merseyside
Royal Lytham & St Annes Golf Club, Lytham St Annes, Lancashire
Seascale Golf Club, Seascale, Cumbria
Silecroft Golf Club (9), Silecroft, Cumbria
Silloth on Solway Golf Club, Silloth on Solway, Cumbria
Southport and Ainsdale Golf Club, Southport, Merseyside
Southport Municipal Golf Links, Southport, Merseyside
St Annes Old Links Golf Club, St Annes-on-Sea, Lancashire
St Bees Golf Club (9), St Bees, Cumbria
Wallasey Golf Club, Wallasey, Merseyside,
The Warren Golf Club (9), Wallasey, Merseyside
West Lancashire Golf Club, Liverpool, Merseyside

North East
Alnmouth Village Golf Club (9), Alnmouth, Northumberland
Bamburgh Castle Golf Club, Bamburgh, Northumberland
Berwick-upon-Tweed Golf Club (Goswick), Berwick-upon-Tweed, Northumberland
Cleveland Golf Club, Redcar, North Yorkshire
Ganton Golf Club, Ganton, North Yorkshire
Dunstanburgh Castle Golf Club, Embleton, Northumberland
Hartlepool Golf Club, Hartlepool, County Durham
Newbiggin Golf Club, Newbiggin-by-the-Sea, Northumberland
Seahouses Golf Club, Seahouses, Northumberland
Seaton Carew Golf Club, Hartlepool, County Durham
Warkworth Golf Club (9), Warkworth, Northumberland

Wales

South Wales
Pennard Golf Club, Southgate, Swansea
Pyle and Kenfig Golf Club, Kenfig, Mid Glamorgan
Royal Porthcawl Golf Club, Porthcawl, Mid Glamorgan
Southerndown Golf Club, Ogmore-by-Sea, Mid Glamorgan 
Swansea Bay Golf Club, Neath, West Glamorgan

West Wales
Ashburnham Golf Club, Burry Port, Carmarthenshire
Cardigan Golf Club, Cardigan, Ceredigion
Machynys Peninsula Golf Club, Machynys, Carmarthenshire
Newport Links Golf Club, Newport, Pembrokeshire
St. Davids City Golf Club (9), St. Davids, Pembrokeshire
Tenby Golf Club, Tenby, Pembrokeshire

Mid Wales
Borth & Ynyslas Golf Club, Borth, Ceredigion

North Wales
Abersoch Golf Club, Abersoch, Gwynedd
Aberdovey Golf Club, Aberdyfi, Gwynedd
Anglesey Golf Club, Rhosneigr, Anglesey
Conwy Golf Club, Conwy
Nefyn & District Golf Club, Morfa Nefyn, Gwynedd
North Wales Golf Club, Llandudno
Porthmadog Golf Club, Porthmadog, Gwynedd
Prestatyn Golf Club, Prestatyn, Denbighshire
Pwllheli Golf Club, Pwllheli, Gwynedd
Rhyl Golf Club (9), Rhyl, Denbighshire
Royal St David's Golf Club, Harlech, Gwynedd

Northern Ireland

Ardglass Golf Club – Ardglass, County Down
Ballycastle Golf Club, Ballycastle, County Antrim
Bushfoot Golf Club (9), Portballintrae, County Antrim
Cairndhu Golf Club, Ballygalley, County Antrim
Castlerock Golf Club – Mussenden Course, Castlerock, County Londonderry
Castlerock Golf Club – Bann Course (9), Castlerock, County Londonderry
Kirkistown Castle Golf Club, Cloughey, County Down
Larne Golf Club, Larne, County Antrim
Portstewart Golf Club – Strand Course, Portstewart, County Londonderry
Portstewart Golf Club – Old Course, Portstewart, County Londonderry
Portstewart Golf Club – Riverside Course, Portstewart, County Londonderry
Royal County Down Golf Club – Championship Course, Newcastle, County Down
Royal County Down Golf Club – Annesley Course, Newcastle, County Down
Royal Portrush Golf Club – Dunluce Course, Portrush, County Antrim
Royal Portrush Golf Club – Valley Course (Rathmore), Portrush, County Antrim

Channel Islands
Alderney Golf Club (9), St. Anne, Alderney
La Moye Golf Club, La Moye, Jersey
Royal Guernsey Golf Club, Guernsey
Royal Jersey Golf Club, Jersey

Republic of Ireland

South East
Arklow Golf Club, Arklow, Co Wicklow
Corballis Links Pitch & Putt Club, Donabate, Co Dublin
The European Club, Arklow, Co Wicklow
The Island Golf Club, Donabate, Co Dublin
Portmarnock Golf Club – Championship Course, Portmarnock, Co Dublin 
Portmarnock Golf Club – Yellow Course (9), Portmarnock, Co Dublin 
Portmarnock Hotel & Golf Links, Portmarnock, Co Dublin
Rosslare Golf Club – Championship Course, Rosslare, Co Wexford
Rosslare Golf Club – Burrow Course (9), Rosslare, Co Wexford
Royal Dublin Golf Club, Bull Island, Co Dublin
Rush Golf Club (9), Rush, Co Dublin
St Anne's Golf Club, Bull Island, Co Dublin
Sutton Golf Club (9), Sutton, Co Dublin
Wicklow Golf Club, Wicklow, Co Wicklow

North East
County Louth (Baltray) Golf Club, Drogheda, County Louth
Laytown & Bettystown Golf Club, Bettystown, Co Meath
Seapoint Golf Club, Drogheda, Co Louth

Munster

Ballybunion Golf Club – Old Course, Ballybunion, Co Kerry 
Ballybunion Golf Club – Cashen Course, Ballybunion, Co Kerry 
Castlegregory Golf & Fishing Club (9), Castlegregory, Co Kerry
Dingle Golf Links, Dingle, Co Kerry
Dooks Golf Club, Glenbeigh, Co Kerry
Doonbeg Golf Club, Doonbeg, Co Clare
Kilkee Golf Club, Kilkee, Co Clare
Lahinch Golf Club – Old Course, Lahinch, Co Clare
Lahinch Golf Club – Castle Course, Lahinch, Co Clare
Old Head of Kinsale, Kinsale, Co Cork
Spanish Point Golf Club (9), Spanish Point, Co Clare
Tralee Golf Club, Tralee, Co Kerry
Waterville Golf Club, Waterville, Co Kerry

Connacht
Achill Island Golf Club (9), Keel, Co Mayo
Carne Golf Club – Hackett Course, Belmullet, Co Mayo
Carne Golf Club – Kilmore Course (9), Belmullet, Co Mayo
Connemara Golf Links – Championship (A & B Nine) Course, Ballyconneely, Co Galway
Connemara Golf Links – C Nine (9), Ballyconneely, Co Galway
Connemara Isles Golf Club, Derrygorman, Co Galway
County Sligo Golf Club – Championship Course, Sligo, Co Sligo
County Sligo Golf Club – Bomore Course (9), Sligo, Co Sligo
Enniscrone Golf Club – Dunes Course, Enniscrone, Co Sligo
Enniscrone Golf Club – Scurmore Course (9), Enniscrone, Co Sligo
Mulranny Golf Club (9), Mulranny, Co Mayo
Strandhill Golf Club, Strandhill, Co Sligo

Donegal
Ballyliffin Golf Club – Glashedy Course, Ballyliffin, Co Donegal
Ballyliffin Golf Club – Old Course, Ballyliffin, Co Donegal
Buncrana Golf Club (9), Buncrana, Co Donegal
Bundoran Golf Club, Bundoran, Co Donegal
Cruit Island Golf Club (9), Cruit Island, Co Donegal
Donegal Golf Club, Donegal, Co Donegal
Dunfanaghy Golf Club, Dunfanaghy, Co Donegal
Gweedore Golf Club (9), Derrybeg, Co Donegal
Greencastle Golf Club, Co Donegal
Narin & Portnoo Golf Club, Narin, County Donegal
North West Golf Club, Buncrana, Co Donegal
Otway Golf Club (9), Rathmullan, Co Donegal (closed 2019)
Portsalon Golf Club, Portsalon, Co Donegal
Rosapenna Golf Club – Sandy Hills Links, Carrigart, Co Donegal
Rosapenna Golf Club – Old Tom Morris Links, Carrigart, Co Donegal
Rosapenna Golf Club – St Patrick's Links, Carrigart, Co Donegal (opened 2021)
Rosapenna Golf Club – Coastguard Nine (9), Carrigart, Co Donegal

Belgium
Royal Ostend Golf Club, De Haan, West-Vlaanderen
Royal Zoute (Knokke) Golf Club, Knokke-Zoute, West-Vlaanderen

Denmark
Fanø Golf Links, Fanø

Finland
Vuosaari Golf, Helsinki
Tapiola Golf, Espoo

France
Belle Dune Golf Club, Fort-Mahon-Plage, Picardie
Chiberta Golf Club, Anglet, Aquitaine
Dinard Golf Club, Saint-Briac-sur-Mer, Bretagne
Golf de St Cast, Saint-Cast-le-Guildo, Bretagne
Etretat Golf Club, Etretat, Haut-Normandie
Granville Golf Club, Breville sur Mer, Basse-Normandie
La Touquet Golf Club – La Mer, Le Touquet, Nord-Pas-de-Calais
Pleneuf-Val Andre Golf Club, Pleneuf-Val Andre
Ploemeur Ocean Golf Club, Ploemeur, Bretagne
Wimereux Golf Club, Wimereux, Nord-Pas-de-Calais

Germany
Budersand Hotel, Gold & Spa, Budersand, Hornum
Nordeney Golf Club (9), Nordeney
Nordsee Golf Club (9), St Peter-Ording

Greece
Costa Navarino – Dunes Course, Costa Navarino, Messinia

Italy
San Domenico Golf Club, Savelletri di Fasano, Puglia
Verdura Golf & Spa Resort, Sciacca, Sicily
Donnafugata Golf Resort & Spa – South Course, Ragusa, Sicily

Netherlands
Domburgsche Golf Club (9), Domburg, Zeeland
Kennemer Golf Club, Zandvoort, North Holland
Open Golf Zandvoort, Zandvoort, North Holland
Noordwijkse Golf Club, Noordwijk, South Holland
Royal Haagsche Golf & Country Club, Wassenaar, South Holland
De Texelse Golf Club, De Cocksdorp, Texel, North Holland

Norway
Lofoten Golf Links, Gimsøy, Lofoten

Poland
Sand Valley, Paslek

Portugal
Oitavos Dunes Golf Links, Cascais
Praia D'El Rey Beach & Golf Resort, Praia D'El Rei, Obidos, Costa Prata
Troia Golf, Carvalhal, Grandola
Porto Santo Golf, Porto Santo, Madeira
CS Salgados Golf, Salgados, Albufeira

Russia
Links National Golf Resort, Rogachevo, Moscow region
Zavidovo PGA National, Zavidovo, Tver region

Spain
Alcaidesa Links Resort, Alcaidesa, Andalucia
El Saler Golf Club, El Saler, Valencia

Sweden
Falsterbo Golf Club, Fyrvagen, Falsterbo
Grönhögen Golf Club, Grönhögen, Kalmar Län 
Ljunghusen Golf Club, Kinells väg, Höllviken
Helsingborg Golf Club (9), Viken
Flommen Golf Club, Falsterbo

Turkey
Lykia Links, Denizyaka, Antalya

North America

United States

Midwest and Rocky Mountains
Arcadia Bluffs Golf Club, Arcadia, Michigan 
Ballyneal Golf Club, Holyoke, Colorado
Bay Harbor Golf Club – Links Course, Petoskey, Michigan
Mammoth Dunes, Nekoosa, Wisconsin
Sand Hills Golf Club, Mullen, Nebraska 
Sand Valley, Nekoosa, Wisconsin
Wawashkamo Golf Club, Mackinac Island, Michigan
Whistling Straits – Irish Course, Haven, Wisconsin
Whistling Straits – Straits Course, Haven, Wisconsin

Northeast
Bayonne Golf Club, Bayonne, New Jersey
Highland Links, Truro, Massachusetts
Maidstone Club, East Hampton, New York
Rye Golf Club (Rye, New York), Rye, New York
Sankaty Head Golf Club, Siasconset, Massachusetts
Shinnecock Hills Golf Club, Shinnecock Hills, New York

Pacific
Bandon Dunes Golf Resort – Bandon Dunes, Bandon, Oregon
Bandon Dunes Golf Resort – Bandon Trails, Bandon, Oregon
Bandon Dunes Golf Resort – Old Macdonald, Bandon, Oregon
Bandon Dunes Golf Resort – Pacific Dunes, Bandon, Oregon
Bandon Dunes Golf Resort – Sheep Ranch, Bandon, Oregon (opened June 2020)
Chambers Bay, University Place, Washington
Cypress Point Club, Pebble Beach, California
Gearhart Golf Links, Gearhart, Oregon
Ocean Course, Half Moon Bay, California
Pebble Beach Golf Links, Pebble Beach, California
The Sea Ranch Golf Links, Sea Ranch, California
Spyglass Hill Golf Course, Pebble Beach, California
The Links at Spanish Bay, Pebble Beach, California

South
Isle Dauphine Golf Club, Dauphin Island, Alabama
Nags Head Golf Links, Nags Head, North Carolina
The Ocean Course, Kiawah Island, South Carolina
Streamsong Resort – Red Course, Streamsong, Florida
Streamsong Resort – Blue Course, Streamsong, Florida
Streamsong Resort – Black Course, Streamsong, Florida

Canada
Cabot Links, Inverness, Nova Scotia
Cabot Cliffs, Inverness, Nova Scotia
Harmon Links, Stephenville, Newfoundland
Northumberland Links, Pugwash, Nova Scotia
Kings Links, Delta, British Columbia

Mexico
Diamante Dunes Golf Club, Cabo San Lucas, Baja California Sur
Paraiso del Mar Golf & Country Club, La Paz, Baja California Sur
Tres Vidas Acapulco, Acapulco, Guerrero

Central and South America

Argentina
Mar del Plata Golf Club, Buenos Aires

Brazil
Costa do Sauipe Golf Links, Mata de Sao Joao, Bahia (closed)

Oceania

Australia

Western Australia
Albany Golf Club, Albany
The Cut Golf Course, Dawesville
The Links Kennedy Bay, Port Kennedy
Sea View Golf Club (9), Cottesloe

South Australia
Links Lady Bay Resort, Normanville
Royal Adelaide Golf Club, Seaton, Adelaide

Victoria
Barwon Heads Golf Club, Barwon Heads
The Dunes Golf Links, Rye
Moonah Links – Legends Course, Fingal
Moonah Links – Old Course, Fingal
The National Golf Club – Moonah Links, Cape Schanck
The National Golf Club – Ocean Links, Cape Schanck
Port Fairy Golf Club, Port Fairy
Portsea Golf Club, Portsea
St Andrews Beach Golf Course, St Andrews Beach
The Sands Torquay Golf Club, Torquay
Thirteenth Beach Golf Links, Barwon Heads
Commonwealth Golf Club, Oakleigh South, Melbourne
Huntingdale Golf Club, Oakleigh South, Melbourne
Kingston Heath, Cheltenham, Melbourne
Metropolitan Golf Club, Oakleigh South, Melbourne
Royal Melbourne Golf Club, Black Rock, Melbourne
Victoria Golf Club, Cheltenham, Melbourne
Yarra Yarra Golf Club, Bentleigh East, Melbourne

New South Wales
Belmont Golf Course, Belmont N.S.W.
The Links Shellcove, Shellharbour
Long Reef Golf Club, Collaroy
Magenta Shores Golf & Country Club, Magenta
New South Wales Golf Club, Sydney
St Michael's Golf Club, Little Bay, Sydney
Wollongong Golf Club, Wollongong
Bonnie Doon Golf Club, Sydney
The Lakes Golf Club, Sydney

Queensland
Hope Island Resort, Hope Island
Palmer Sea Reef, Port Douglas

Tasmania
Barnbougle Dunes, Bridport
Barnbougle Lost Farm, Bridport
Bougle Run (14), Bridport
Cape Wickham Golf Links, King Island
King Island Golf & Bowling Club (9), King Island
Ocean Dunes Golf Course, King Island

New Zealand

South Island
Chisholm Park Golf Club, Tainui, Dunedin
Hokitika Golf Club, Hokitika, West Coast
Karamea Golf Club (9), Karamea, West Coast
Nelson Golf Links, Nelson
Oreti Sands Golf Club, Invercargill (closed 2018)
Otakou Golf Club (9), Otakou, Otago Peninsula
Takaka Golf Club (9), Clifton, Tasman
Westport Golf Club, Westport, West Coast

North Island
Kaitaia Golf Club, Kaitaia
Miramar Links Golf Club, Wellington
Muriwai Golf Club, Muriwai Beach
Paraparaumu Beach Golf Club, Paraparaumu
Tara iti Golf Club, Mangawhai
Te Arai Golf Club – South Course, Mangawhai (opens 2022)
Te Arai Golf Club – North Course, Mangawhai (opens TBA)

Africa

Morocco
Mazagan Beach Resort, El Jadida
Royal Golf Mohammedia, Casablanca

South Africa
Atlantic Beach Golf Club, Cape Town, Western Cape
Fancourt Hotel and Country Club, George, Western Cape
Humewood Golf Course, Port Elizabeth, Eastern Cape

References

Links